Nightclubbing is the fifth studio album by Jamaican singer and songwriter Grace Jones, released on 11 May 1981 by Island Records. Recorded at Compass Point Studios with producers Alex Sadkin and Island Records' president Chris Blackwell, as well as a team of session musicians rooted by rhythm section Sly and Robbie, the album marked her second foray into a new wave style that blends a variety of genres, including reggae, art pop, dub, synth-pop and funk. The album has cover versions of songs by Bill Withers, Iggy Pop, Astor Piazzolla, and others, and original songs, three of which co-written by Jones.

The album received positive reviews upon its release, including being voted best album of the year by writers of the UK music magazine NME, and has continued to be praised by critics over time, with some reviewers commending the singer's unique sound and organic fusion of genres. The album entered in the top 10 in five countries, and became Jones' highest-ranking record on the US Billboard 200 and R&B charts. Six singles were released from the album, including the hits "Pull Up to the Bumper" and "I've Seen That Face Before (Libertango)".

Critics and scholars have noted the album's influence on popular music, citing its unique sound that has been emulated by both pop and alternative acts, and how the persona Jones adopted – deeply inspired by art and fashion – has had an enduring influence on modern female pop singers. Around the time of the album's release, she adopted her characteristic androgynous look which would become popular in fashion. Nightclubbing is now widely considered Jones' magnum opus and the record that cemented her pop icon status.

Background and production

Jones was a popular fashion model and Studio 54 habituée before starting her recording career. Her first three albums "were heavily influenced by disco and cemented her presence in the club scene." These records "operated around the camper end of the spectrum," and built a large gay cult following around the singer. According to Pitchfork, these albums "were fun but somewhat facile, cover-filled reflections of the druggy hedonism of the disco era". T. Cole Rachel writes: "For someone whose very image was seen as somehow deeply transgressive, Jones' music had not yet caught up." When her 1977 rendition of Edith Piaf's "La Vie en rose" was an international hit, she caught the interest of Chris Blackwell, the founder of Island Records. After Jones' 1979 album Muse found little success in nightclubs and charts, he took over as her producer. He sought to "treat her not as a model, but to involve her as a musician", and wanted "her to feel as though she were a member of a band, and record her the way bands used to make albums, with the singer and the players doing their thing all at once." Blackwell assembled a sextet of studio ringers at his Nassau studio, Compass Point, pulling together a band that included Sly and Robbie (consisting of bass guitarist Robbie Shakespeare and drummer Sly Dunbar), French keyboardist Wally Badarou, guitarists Mikey Chung and Barry Reynolds, and percussionist Uziah Thompson. Jones has described the group as "the united nations in the studio".

As the disco backlash began in earnest, Jones veered towards the contemporary new wave style. Blackwell had been impressed by Black Uhuru's 1980 album Sinsemilla and, along with engineer Alex Sadkin, decided that Jones' new sound should take elements from that record's sonority. Besides reggae, the band also incorporated dance music. Sly Dunbar said, "We loved dance music, we'd listen to everything, because we were always working and wanting the reggae we did to move a bit forward, so anything that we could drag to it, we would bring that – as ideas, or as musicians coming to play with us." Ditching the camp quality of Jones' previous work, Blackwell realised new forms around the likes of The Pretenders' "Private Life", Roxy Music's "Love Is the Drug" and The Normal's "Warm Leatherette"; Ian Wade of The Quietus writes: "Nightclubbing was where all these ideas coalesced into perfection." The band Blackwell assembled later became known as the "Compass Point Allstars", taking up residency in the Bahamian studio and animating hits by Tom Tom Club, Robert Palmer, Joe Cocker and Gwen Guthrie, among others.

The recording sessions "moved with disarming speed and ease"; Blackwell recounts: "If Grace or the group hadn't nailed a song by the third take, it was dropped and they'd move to the next number." Although the band was initially called upon in early 1980 to work on a single album, they ended up recording far more material than could fit one LP. As a result, these sessions resulted in two studio albums: Warm Leatherette – released in 1980 – and Nightclubbing. Final overdubs and additional songs were recorded during 1981. Wally Badarou has recognised Jones' active role in the sessions, stating: "Grace was there even during most instrumental overdubbing sessions. She was a part of the sound and the spirit that came out almost from nowhere. We all knew we were in for something quite experimental."

Composition

Style

Continuing the orientation of Jones' previous release Warm Leatherette, Nightclubbing is a pop album that forays into new wave and dance, while in terms of rhythm it is, ostensibly, a reggae record. John Daniel Bull of The Line of Best Fit felt the album "[pinpointed] the peak of [Jones'] Jamaican influences, by way of reggae rhythms blended with R&B beats." However, Treble writes: "in terms of atmosphere and melody, there's nothing roots or rude-boy about it." The magazine also considered Nightclubbing to be an important exponent of sophisti-pop, placing it "somewhere between art-pop and dub"; it also described its sonority as "a lush landscape of surrealist synth-pop." The Style Con's Erich Kessel felt the album was an influential exponent of art-pop. Nightclubbing also incorporates elements of electro, and New York club music.

A post-disco album, Nightclubbing features a distinct and unprecedented sound that also incorporates rock, funk and post-punk music. The Rolling Stone Album Guide (1992) reads: "Leavening their sprung riddims with a salty dash of funk, Sly and Robbie hipped Jones to rock's new wave on Warm Leatherette and Nightclubbing." According to John Doran of BBC Music, Nightclubbing is a "post-punk pop" album that, "delved into the worlds of disco, reggae and funk much more successfully than most of her 'alternative' contemporaries, while still retaining a blank-eyed alienation that was more reminiscent of David Bowie or Ian Curtis than most of her peers." The influence of David Bowie (Who co-wrote the title track) was also noted by Joe Muggs of Fact.

The "languid reggae-influenced" tracks allowed Jones to showcase her singular vocal style, characterized by low alto singing and a Jamaican style of vocal delivery – "that of 'chatting' over onto tracks" – within a framework of androgyny. This style of delivery has been likened to that of The Velvet Underground's Lou Reed, Blondie's Debbie Harry, the New York City punk scene, and Gil Scott-Heron in "The Revolution Will Not Be Televised". Pitchfork described Jones' voice as a "flat monotone speak-singing." T. Cole Rachel, writing for the same publication, argued that Jones succeeds not by the power of her voice, but by the power of her persona, writing: "As she would go on to prove in later efforts, it was the monolithic force of her personality—imperious, feral, queer in the truest sense of the word—that would make these songs so compelling. She is, to put it simply, impossible to ignore."

Songs

The original version of "Libertango" was discovered by Jones's boyfriend at the time, artist Jean-Paul Goude, and the video for the song was filmed on the outdoor terrace of Jones's penthouse apartment on 16th Street in New York. The song also features a verse sung in French: the text was translated for Jones by Blackwell's girlfriend, actress Nathalie Delon, for which Delon received a writing credit. Two of the album's tracks, "I've Done It Again" and "Demolition Man" were written specifically for Jones to record on Nightclubbing. The latter song was written by Sting and would also be recorded in a more uptempo style by his band the Police for their album Ghost in the Machine, released six months after Nightclubbing.

The remaining three new compositions on the record were all co-written by Jones. "Pull Up to the Bumper" began as an instrumental track by the Compass Point Allstars rhythm section Sly and Robbie (credited on the track under their collective alias "Koo Koo Baya"), and provisionally called "Pour Yourself Over Me Like Peanut Butter". Jones's friend, singer Dana Mano, came up with the song's new title, which inspired the two women to write a set of suggestive lyrics for the track. Despite this, Jones denied that the lyrics were explicitly sexual, insisting that she felt the words were just written to suit the music, but stated that she was happy to accept whatever interpretation someone might put on the lyrics, saying, "I don't want to sing sweet things, though I don't mind sweetness so long as it has a little sour meaning underneath". Jones admitted that "Art Groupie" was highly autobiographical as many of her boyfriends had been artists and she was attracted to the whole art scene.

Artwork

Cover
Nightclubbings iconic artwork is a 1981 painted photograph titled Blue-Black in Black on Brown, created in New York by Goude. This was the singular image that accompanied the original LP, as it "was concealed in a plain, black inner sleeve, no lyrics and with no photo on the back cover." Composed by right angles, the photograph shows Jones cut to waist, bare chested, and dressed in an Armani man's wide shouldered suit, with an unlit cigarette aiming downward from her lip. She is shot with her signature flat top haircut and her chest bones showing; her dark skin confers upon the image a violet, blue-black colour. The image is noted for its androgyny, with Jones not only "[unpicking] some of the boundaries of unconventionality, but [choosing] to confuse such boundaries." Rick Poynor writes: "Goude admired Jones for her mixture of beauty and threat, and the Nightclubbing portrait expresses this duality with absolute composure and no false histrionics." Piers Martin of Uncut felt the cover was "arresting", and wrote: "the indigo mood, cool gaze and cigarette suggested Marlene Dietrich, the gender-bending a touch of Bowie."

In 2015, Dazed included the album cover in an article dedicated to their "favourite Armani cult crossovers." Biju Belinky wrote:
Although Armani became known for deconstructing the suit, removing the over-the-top padding and offering a relaxed option to formalwear in American Gigolo, the cover for Grace Jones' iconic 1981 album Nightclubbing plays up with the angles like nothing else before it. Hailed as a pioneer of the androgynous look, with a cigarette dangling from her mouth and a flattop haircut, complemented by the padded shoulders of an Armani jacket, the avant-garde singer's album cover became known for years to come.

Writing for DIY, Simon Russell Beale listed the album cover as one of the greatest of all time, highlighting Jones' "smouldering noir-bisexuality". Graphic designer Storm Thorgerson included the picture in his 1999 book, 100 Best Album Covers. Moreover, American Photo placed it in its list of The 30 Best Album Covers. NME included it in its list of 20 Original Album Covers That Are Actually Works of Art, with the entry reading: "Can any other artist boast as many iconic album covers? Grace is a work of art herself, as are the covers for Island Life, Slave to the Rhythm and Living My Life, but best of all is the louche image of Nightclubbing by Jean-Paul Goude, part Tretchikoff's Green Lady, part the best advert for smoking you've ever seen." Time Out listed the image as one of the "sexiest album covers of all time", with Brent DiCrescenzo writing: "[Grace Jones] was a work of art, a statue." According to i-D, "it was a series of consistently stellar album artwork that helped propel [the singer] from musician to icon." The artwork was held in display at the Padiglione d'Arte Contemporanea in Milan, Italy, as part of the 2016 So Far So Goude exhibition, focused on the French artist.

Video
According to Barry Waters of The Pitchfork Review, "Jones' singular appearance and meticulously crafted presentation made her a natural fit for the burgeoning music video medium, especially in its early, experimental days." Jean-Paul Goude directed the music videos for "I've Seen That Face Before (Libertango)" and "Pull Up to the Bumper", as well as the celebrated 1982 VHS release A One Man Show. The latter – a montage of still photography, concert footage and music videos – "asserted [Jones] as an astute visual artist" and was nominated for Best Long Form Music Video at the 26th Annual Grammy Awards. Nelson George, reviewing the release for Billboard in early 1983, called it "one of the more fascinating and defiantly visual concert videos yet produced." According to Ernest Hardy of CraveOnline, the film "seamlessly blends cabaret, performance art and underground nightclub cool."

Release
Nightclubbing became Jones' chart breakthrough and remains one of the greatest commercial triumphs of her entire career. It entered the top five in no less than four countries, and became the singer's highest-charting record on the US Billboard mainstream albums and R&B charts. The album brought Jones from being a former disco diva with a loyal cult following but dropping sales figures to an international star with mainstream chart success. It later formed the basis of her groundbreaking concept tour A One Man Show.

Universal Music Group re-released the album on vinyl in 2009.

Release of a two-disc deluxe set, containing most of the 12" single versions of singles, plus two unreleased tracks from the Nightclubbing sessions, occurred on 28 April 2014, and Jones enjoyed a UK top 50 chart placing the following week – her first since 2008.

To promote the album, Jones appeared on various TV shows in 1981, including the French Palmarès, the Spanish Esta noche,
 and Aktuelle Schaubude in West Germany.

Singles
The lead single from the album was "Demolition Man". The single was not a commercial success and did not chart, although would later become one of Jones' signature songs. "I've Seen That Face Before (Libertango)" was released as the second single and became one of the most commercially successful songs in Jones' repertoire. It secured top 20 positions in several European countries and became another signature song for Jones.

The R&B-dance track "Pull Up to the Bumper" was a quick follow-up to "Libertango". It met with a great success on the US club market, but turned out a modest hit in Europe upon original release. The song would re-emerge in Europe in 1985 as a major success, especially in the UK, where backed with "La Vie en rose" it became one of Jones' highest-charting singles in that country.

"Use Me" and "Feel Up" were then released as singles, but were unsuccessful in the charts. The final single off Nightclubbing, "Walking in the Rain", was a minor chart success.

Critical reception

In the UK Adrian Thrills of NME said, "I spent an otherwise-miserable weekend afternoon with the sound of Grace swirling around my little earphones, grooving on songs effortlessly sung but put together with a jeweller's eye for detail", and stated that the musicians "combine to etch out a shifting, soulful surface, an exotic ice-water backdrop for Grace's vocal veneer", noting that "the only times Grace seems ill-at-ease are as she swops Trenchtown patois with, presumably, the sharp-lipped Sly and then tries to rock out on Sting's 'Demolition Man'". Roz Reines of Melody Maker called it "an album with something for everyone: reggae, electronics, disco, blues – even a snatch of salsa funk. The incredible thing is that it all gels together so well – the common denominator is the danceability, which lasts all the way through: changes in tempo and pace only help to sustain the energy level." Deanne Pearson of Smash Hits said that Jones' voice has "neither range nor power", but "the arrangements and production almost make up for this." Record Mirror critic Simon Ludgate found that Jones transcends her vocal limitations through "her character and sense of the surreal".

Andy Kellman of AllMusic praised the album in a retrospective review, stating: "Sly & Robbie provide ideal backdrops for Jones yet again, casting a brisk but not bristly sheen over buoyant structures. Never before and never since has a precisely chipped block of ore been so seductive." Mark Coleman wrote in The Rolling Stone Album Guide that Sly and Robbie's introduction of new wave rock to Jones and the "throbbing polyrhythmic" covers of rock songs suited her better than the Edith Piaf-meets-Barry White routines" of her records. Robert Christgau was less enthusiastic. He was unmoved by Jones' own songs and said while the covers on Warm Leatherette were superior to the originals simply because of her "weird force of personality", she could not match "Use Me" and the title track.

Nightclubbing continued to gather favorable reviews with the release of the deluxe edition in 2014. Andy Beta from Pitchfork labeled the album's reissue as "Best New Reissue", describing the album as "the record that further cemented her iconic status in pop culture". He also stated: "She treats each cover not as a singer tackling a song, but as an actor inhabiting the skin of a role". Mojo called it "probably the greatest of Grace Jones' Compass Point trio". Uncuts Piers Martin called Nightclubbing "the album that came to define Jones as the complete performer, in her own way, as singer, muse, actress, alien and androgyne. Its sound, a sublime mix of reggae, funk, new wave and disco, was as arresting as its cover image... No one had seen or heard anything quite like this". In Record Collector Kris Needs said that "Nightclubbing still sounds like nothing else released during the 80s, though its colossal influence repeatedly reveals itself". John Harris of Q wrote that "the music on Nightclubbing is as stripped-down and full of space as Jones's froideur demanded. Then again, when it evokes more emotional qualities, it also triumphs."

Legacy

Nightclubbing distinctive amalgamation of rock, funk, post-punk, pop and reggae set Jones apart from other musical acts of the 1980s. It is considered one of the early convergences of "fashion, art, and music".<ref name="stylecon">{{cite web|url=http://www.thestylecon.com/2014/05/08/art-pop-art-pop/|title=Art-Pop before 'Art Pop|last=Kessel|first=Eric|date=8 May 2014|publisher=The Style Con|access-date=5 August 2016|archive-url=https://web.archive.org/web/20180101095730/http://www.thestylecon.com/2014/05/08/art-pop-art-pop/|archive-date=1 January 2018|url-status=dead}}</ref> According to Pitchforks Andy Beta, it "altered the face of modern pop". He further argued that the album's musical and visual influence is easily palpable in the musical landscape of the 21st century, specially among female musicians such as Lady Gaga, Rihanna, Nicki Minaj, M.I.A., Grimes and FKA Twigs, among others. Other acts influenced by the record include Róisín Murphy, Janelle Monáe, Azealia Banks and Adam Lambert. Beyond pop music, the template set by Jones and her Compass Point backing band was also influential to alternative music, including Massive Attack, Todd Terje, Gorillaz, Hot Chip, and LCD Soundsystem – who "emulate those rubbery yet taut grooves of Sly & Robbie and cohorts". In Q, John Harris wrote: "The fact that this music was first released 33 years ago beggars belief: it showcases great minds alighting on the future, and points the way to Madonna, Björk, Lady Gaga, Gorillaz, M.I.A. and more." According to Molly Beauchemin, Jones "pioneered the way for Shamir, Stromae, and countless other dance mavericks of today – not just with her bewitching candor but through her use of androgynous innuendo". Polari Magazine considered Nightclubbing to be "a defining moment in the history of pop music".

The album further cemented Jones' pop icon status. According to Erich Kessel, "[the singer's] performances were a source of rich critiques on race, gender, and blackness." Her pioneering androgynous aesthetic – conceived alongside Jean-Paul Goude – had a strong impact on the pop culture of the 1980s; for example, it was a precursor to Annie Lennox's persona. According to Abigail Gardner, "Jones was an androgynous audiovisual experience, one who sat comfortably within the context of early 1980s pop, where image had become even more central to pop performance through the emergence of MTV." She further argued that the singer "problematises ideas of black feminine in performance art that contributed to a reconceptualisation of Afrocentric culture and identity." Miriam Kershaw positioned Jones "not as a singer or a diva, but as a piece of art", and argued that she "worked to destabilise racist and sexist clichés as she charted a dynamic course through the history of the Black diaspora, to celebrate its vibrant contemporary form." The singer's gender-bending and unrestrained sexuality also won the acclaim of the gay community, being included in Out "The 100 Greatest, Gayest Albums of All Time" and Attitudes "Top 50 Gay Albums of All Time". i-D writes: "Jones transcended definition in almost every realm of her life. She is often referred to as a queer icon. [...] She rejects all labels of sexuality, and her musical output is similarly fluid, switching from pop and disco to dub and reggae without hesitation."

In The Village Voices Pazz & Jop critics' poll of 1981, Nightclubbing placed at number 31, while "Pull Up to the Bumper" was voted the year's 11th best single. It also appeared in the year-end lists of Sounds, Rockerilla, OOR, The Face, Melody Maker and NME – the latter considering it the best album of 1981. Slant Magazine listed Nightclubbing as the 40th best album of the 1980s, with Henderson writing it "performs double duty, building up the singer's legend even as it makes attempts at deconstructing it." NME included the album in its list of The 500 Greatest Albums of All Time, with its entry stating: "A glimpse into the sordid disco depravities behind the velvet rope at Studio 54, Nightclubbing and its standout smash "Pull Up to the Bumper" shunted new wave, reggae and disco firmly into the seductive neon '80s with a single arse/car metaphor." The Guardian listed Nightclubbing as one of the "1000 albums to hear before you die".

Accolades
The information regarding lists including Nightclubbing is adapted from Acclaimed Music, except where otherwise noted.

Track listing

 The two-disc deluxe remastered version states that the writer(s) of "If You Wanna Be My Lover" is unknown.

Personnel
Credits adapted from Nightclubbings liner notes.Musicians Wally Badarou – keyboards
 Monte Browne – rhythm guitar
 Mikey Chung – guitar
 Masai Delon – vocals
 Tyrone Downie – keyboards, vocals
 Sly Dunbar – drums, syndrums
 Jack Emblow – accordion
 Grace Jones – vocals, backing vocals

 Barry Reynolds – guitar
 Jess Roden – vocals
 Robbie Shakespeare – bass guitar
 Mel Speller – percussion, vocals
 Uziah Thompson – percussionProduction'''
Chris Blackwell, Alex Sadkin – production
Ted Jensen – mastering

Charts

Weekly charts

Year-end charts

Certifications

Release history

See also

1980s in music
Music of the United Kingdom (1980s)
Music of Jamaica
1980s in Western fashion
Media studies
Reggae fusion
Gay icon

References

Bibliography

External links
 
  statistics, tagging and previews at Last.fm
  at Rate Your Music
 , official website

1981 albums
Albums produced by Alex Sadkin
Albums produced by Chris Blackwell
Grace Jones albums
Island Records albums
Post-disco albums
Post-punk albums
Synth-pop albums
Art pop albums
Sophisti-pop albums